Some People is a 1962 film directed by Clive Donner. It stars Kenneth More and Ray Brooks and is centred on the Duke of Edinburgh's Award Scheme.

Premise
An aircraft engineer, who also acts as a voluntary choirmaster and youth worker (played by Kenneth More) tries to help a group of teenagers in Bristol, by encouraging positive social development after they lose their motorcycle licences. They are all in dead-end jobs with no home life and on the fringes of petty crime, but are musically talented.

Cast
 Kenneth More as Mr. Smith
 Ray Brooks as Johnnie
 Anneke Wills as Anne
 David Andrews as Bill
 Angela Douglas as Terry
 David Hemmings as Bert
 Timothy Nightingale as Tim
 Frankie Dymon Jnr as Jimmy
 Harry H. Corbett as Johnnie's Father 
 Fanny Carby as Johnnie's Mother
 Richard Davies as Harper 
 Michael Gwynn as Vicar 
 Cyril Luckham as Magistrate
 Valerie Mountain dubbed Angela Douglas's singing voice

Production
The film was produced by advertising producer James Archibald, who envisioned it as a way to promote the Duke of Edinburgh scheme. He used this to get star Kenneth More to appear for nothing and for Anglo Amalgamated to distribute for free. The film was shot on location. Archibald said generous donations such as these enabled the film "is a $700,000 film that will be brought in for less than $200,000 because of the generosity of the film industry and others."

The film was shot entirely on location in Bristol with Anneke Wills recalling that the crew arrived in Bristol three weeks before shooting to get the feel of Bristol with the boys learning the local accent, riding motorbikes and visiting local dance halls with much of the script being ad-libbed.

Local filming locations were used including the W.D. & H.O. Wills cigarette factory, Royal York Crescent, Clifton Suspension Bridge, the Theatre Royal, the Palace Hotel, Bristol South public baths, the city docks, The Portway and Lockleaze, with Lockleaze School used for much of the interior filming.

Kenneth More agreed to play his role for nothing apart from his expenses because he had no other offers around the time, and the movie was for a good cause: all proceeds were to go to the Duke of Edinburgh's Award Scheme who commissioned the film and the National Playing Fields Association. During filming he began an affair with one of the cast, Angela Douglas, who became his wife.

The film features a test flight of the Bristol 188.

Reception
According to Kinematograph Weekly the film was considered a "money maker" at the British box office in 1962. The film reportedly made a profit, in part because of its low cost. 

The title song was performed in the film by Valerie Mountain and The Eagles. Pye Records released their version as a single. Other versions were released by Carol Deene and the former bass player for The Shadows, Jet Harris.

Variety called it "reasonable entertainment."

References

External links

1962 films
Films directed by Clive Donner
Films scored by Ron Grainer
British musical films
1962 musical films
1960s English-language films
1960s British films